Yuri Stepanovich Dyadyuk (born 13 March 1970) is a Russian professional football coach and a former player. He works as an analyst for the Under-21 squad of FC Rostov.

Playing career
He made his professional debut in the Soviet Second League in 1987 for FC Torpedo Taganrog. He played 5 games and scored 1 goal in the UEFA Intertoto Cup 1999 for FC Rostselmash Rostov-on-Don.

References

Soviet footballers
Russian footballers
Association football midfielders
Association football defenders
Russian Premier League players
FC SKA Rostov-on-Don players
FC Rostov players
FC Lokomotiv Nizhny Novgorod players
1970 births
Sportspeople from Taganrog
Living people
FC Taganrog players
FC Irtysh Omsk players
FC Mashuk-KMV Pyatigorsk players